Eupithecia yelchoensis is a moth in the family Geometridae. It is found in the regions of Biobio (Nuble Province) and Los Lagos (Llanquihue and Paleno provinces) in Chile. The habitat consists of the Northern Valdivian and Valdivian Forest Biotic provinces.

The length of the forewings is about 8.5 mm for males and 8.5–9 mm for females. The forewings are pale brown, fading to white, with blackish-brown areas of scales along the costa and with small brown or greyish-brown areas in the median area extending from the costa to the dark discal spot and along the outer margin below the costa and above the tornus. The hindwings are white to pale greyish white, with an increasing number of pale greyish-brown scales distally. Adults have been recorded on wing in December and January.

Etymology
The specific name is based on the type locality, with the suffix -ensis added.

References

Moths described in 1987
yelchoensis
Moths of South America
Endemic fauna of Chile